This is the discography of Italian singer and songwriter Spagna.

Albums

Studio albums

Compilation albums

Video albums

Singles

References

Discographies of Italian artists
Disco discographies